Gorev Island is a small island lying between Buromskiy Island and Poryadin Island in the Haswell Islands, Antarctica. It was discovered and mapped by the Australasian Antarctic Expedition under Douglas Mawson, 1911–1914. It was remapped by the Soviet expedition of 1956, and named by them for Demetri Gorev, a member of the British Antarctic Expedition, 1910–13, under Robert Falcon Scott.

See also 
 List of antarctic and sub-antarctic islands

References

Islands of Queen Mary Land